Brachypterus is a genus of short-winged flower beetles in the family Kateretidae. There are about 18 described species in Brachypterus.

Species
These 18 species belong to the genus Brachypterus:

 Brachypterus aeneomicans Wollaston, 1865
 Brachypterus capensis
 Brachypterus curtulus Wollaston, 1864
 Brachypterus exaratus Dejean, 1836
 Brachypterus fulvipes Erichson, 1843
 Brachypterus glaber (Newman, 1834)
 Brachypterus globularius Murray, 1864
 Brachypterus horii (Hisamatsu, 1976)
 Brachypterus labiatus Erichson, 1843
 Brachypterus longimanus (Wollaston, 1864)
 Brachypterus minutus Dejean, 1836
 Brachypterus rotundicollis Murray, 1864
 Brachypterus schaefferi Grouvelle, 1912
 Brachypterus troglodytes Murray, 1864
 Brachypterus urticae (Fabricius, 1792) (nettle pollen beetle)
 Brachypterus velatus Wollaston, 1863
 Brachypterus viridinitens Har.Lindberg, 1950
 Brachypterus yukikoae (Hisamatsu, 1976)

References

Further reading

External links

 

Kateretidae
Articles created by Qbugbot